Hanil Networks Co.,Ltd is an IT company headquartered in Seoul, South Korea, and a member of Hanil Cement Group. Established in 1998, it engages in network service, contact center solution, system & security and ERP.

Business division

Services

Digital Space Convergence (DSC)
Branded as "TT Zone", DSC is a Contact Center outsourcing brand.

System Management
Public data center.

IT equipment

System & security
They sell PCs, notebooks and X86 servers.

References

External links
 

Companies based in Seoul
Technology companies established in 1998
South Korean companies established in 1998